Oiselle, French for bird, is a women's running apparel company started by Sally Bergesen in 2008. They also sponsor a professional team, Littlewing Athletics, coached by Lauren Fleshman.
They were the first brand to sponsor a pregnant athlete in 2013 and their other runners have included Kara Goucher and Allyson Felix.

Oiselle was the first women-only brand to sponsor college athletes when they provided the uniforms for Yale's track and cross country teams.

References

Companies established in 2007
Companies based in Seattle